105-106 Capital is the branding given to two Global Radio owned independent radio stations in the United Kingdom:
 Capital North East based in Wallsend, North East England
 Capital Scotland based in Glasgow, Scotland